Vicente Alberti y Vidal (1786 in Mahón – 1859) was a Spanish writer. He wrote Diccionario de voces sagradas, técnicas, históricas y mitológicas in 10 volumes.

People from Mahón
19th-century Spanish writers
19th-century male writers
Spanish male poets
1786 births
1859 deaths